Ventrapragada Halt railway station (station code:VPG) is located on the outskirts of the village of Ventrapragada. It lies on the Vijayawada–Nidadavolu loop line and is administered under Vijayawada railway division of South Coast Railway Zone

References 

Railway stations in Krishna district
Railway stations in Vijayawada railway division